The Cuban Love Song is a 1931 American pre-Code musical film directed by W.S. Van Dyke and written by C. Gardner Sullivan, Bess Meredyth, John Lynch, John Colton, Gilbert Emery, Robert E. Hopkins and Paul Hervey Fox. The film stars Lawrence Tibbett, Lupe Vélez, Ernest Torrence, Jimmy Durante, Karen Morley and Louise Fazenda. The film was released on December 5, 1931 by Metro-Goldwyn-Mayer.

It was the last of four films that the baritone Tibbett made for MGM following the introduction of sound film. The film received a generally favorable critical reception, but suffered badly at the box office. Nonetheless two of the film's songs, "The Cuban Love Song" and "El Manisero", were major hits.

Plot
Shortly after becoming engaged to a socialite, an upper-class American named Terry enlists in the U.S. Marine Corps to get his wild urges out of his system. He and his two friends and comrades get into many scrapes, frequently ending up in the brig. While in Cuba, he falls in love with Nenita, a spirited young woman who sells peanuts from a small cart on the street.

Their relationship is interrupted by America's entry into World War I, and Terry is wounded in the fighting in France. He is nursed back to health by his fiancée, and the two marry. More than a decade later, Terry bumps into his former comrades in New York. This reawakens memories of his carefree days in Cuba. He returns to Havana to find Nenita, only to discover that she has died of fever. However he encounters a boy named Terry, who he realizes is the product of his passionate relationship with Nenita a decade earlier. He adopts the boy and takes him back to the United States where his wife generously welcomes both father and son home.

Cast
 Lawrence Tibbett as Terry
 Lupe Vélez as Nenita
 Ernest Torrence as Romance
 Jimmy Durante as O.O. Jones
 Karen Morley as Crystal
 Louise Fazenda as Elvira
 Hale Hamilton as John
 Mathilde Comont as Aunt Rose

References

Bibliography
 Michelle Vogel. Lupe Velez: The Life and Career of Hollywood's "Mexican Spitfire". McFarland, 2012.

External links
 
 
 
 

1931 films
1930s English-language films
American musical films
1931 musical films
Metro-Goldwyn-Mayer films
Films directed by W. S. Van Dyke
Films scored by Herbert Stothart
American black-and-white films
Films set in Cuba
Films set in France
American World War I films
Films set in the 1910s
Films set in the 1920s
Seafaring films
1930s American films